Avalon is a 2011 Swedish drama film directed by Axel Petersén.

Plot

Janne has just finished a prolonged sentence where he was forced to wear an ankle monitor because of unlawful real estate dealings. Finally a free man Janne is preparing the grand opening of his Båstad nightclub "Avalon". In the 1980s Janne was a successful manager of a nightclub and longs back to that period which was the best time in his life. He is aided by his sister Jackie and is old friend Klas. He is also trying to rekindle his estranged daughter. With "Avalon" looking to be a big success, Janne's newfound happiness is soon shattered when he accidentally kills a baltic guest worker.

Cast 
 Johannes Brost – Janne
 Peter Carlberg – Klas
  – Jackie, Janne's sister
 Carl Johan De Geer – Leif
 Charlotte Wandt - Agnes, Janne's daughter
 Simas Lindesis - Donatas, the guestworker
 Migle Polikeviciute - Irina, Donatas' girlfriend 
 Malou Stiller - Stefanie
 Henrik Lilliér - Becker, a Småland-gangster
 Stefan Huynh - Tonny
 August Wittgenstein - Michel

Spin-off

In 2017 there was a spin-off focusing on the character Becker, called Becker - the king of Tingsryd.

References

External links 

2011 drama films
2011 films
Swedish drama films
2010s Swedish-language films
2010s Swedish films